Tuen Mun Tang Shiu Kin Sports Ground (Traditional Chinese: 屯門鄧肇堅運動場, also known as Tuen Mun Tang Siu Kin Sports Ground) is a multi-use stadium in Hong Kong. It is operated by Leisure and Cultural Services Department of Hong Kong. It is currently the home of Hong Kong Premier League club Rangers.

It is named after thee town Tuen Mun as well as Hong Kong businessman and philanthropist Tang Shiu-kin.

History

2010-11 Hong Kong First Division
The sports ground was used as the home ground for Tuen Mun in the 2010–11 season. This will was the second time the sports ground will be used for Hong Kong First Division games.

Sports Ground Information
Address: Tsing Chung Koon Road, Tuen Mun
Facilities: 1 runway(400m), 1 grass football pitch
Jogging hours: 6:30am to 10:30pm
Maintenance day: every Monday

References
Leisure and Cultural Services Department of Hong Kong - Tuen Mun Sports Grounds

Football venues in Hong Kong
Sport in Tuen Mun District
Tuen Mun
1981 establishments in Hong Kong